Gentiana acaulis, the stemless gentian, or trumpet gentian, is a species of flowering plant in the family Gentianaceae, native to central and southern Europe, from Spain east to the Balkans, growing especially in mountainous regions, such as the Alps and Pyrenees, at heights of .

Description
The leaves, which can be lanceolate, elliptical or obovate, are evergreen, 2–3.5 cm long, in a basal rosette, forming clumps. The trumpet-shaped terminal flowers are blue with olive-green spotted longitudinal throats. They grow on a very short peduncle, 3–6 cm long. The flower stem is often without leaves, or has 1 or 2 pairs of leaves. It likes full sun, is fully hardy and flowers in late spring and summer.

Horticulture
This plant, like others of its genus, is valued in cultivation for the unusually pure intense blue of its blooms. It has gained the Royal Horticultural Society's Award of Garden Merit.

Etymology
The Latin specific epithet acaulis means "short-stemmed".

Taxonomy
The closely related Gentiana clusii, often called by the same common name as this species, differs in its preference for limy (alkaline) soils. It also has shorter leaves and the flowers have no olive-green stripes.

Culture
A depiction of a gentian flower can be seen on the obverse side of Austrian € 0.01 euro coins.

Images

References

External links

acaulis
Alpine flora
Flora of Europe
Flora of the Alps
Flora of the Pyrenees
Plants described in 1753
Taxa named by Carl Linnaeus
Flora of the Carpathians